This is a list of Dutch (the United Provinces of the Netherlands) ships of the line, or sailing warships which formed the Dutch battlefleet. It excludes frigates and lesser warships.

The Dutch were often handicapped by the smaller size of their ships relative to the vessels of other nations, particularly those of England and France.  This was partly due to the shallow home waters of the Netherlands, which limited the maximum draft with which ships could operate.  Consequently, the Dutch did not build large three-deckers such as were found in the navies of England and France, except for a brief period from 1682 to 1695 (and a very few later on). However, the Dutch made up in sheer quantity of ships what they lacked in terms of the size of vessels; the list below is incomplete and does not include some of the many hundreds of Dutch warships belonging to the United Provinces between 1579 (when the Netherlands effectively became independent from Spanish control) and 1795 (in which latter year the French invaded and established the puppet state of the Batavian Republic).

The Five Admiralties
Administratively and politically, there was not a single Dutch Navy but five distinct Admiralties. In the south was the Admiralty of Zeeland covering the Province of Zeeland (indicated by "(Z)" preceding a ship's name in the list below). Next were three covering the Province of Holland - the Admiralty of the Maas (or "Maze") in the south of Holland, centred on Rotterdam (indicated by "(M)"), the Admiralty of Amsterdam in the centre of the Province (indicated by "(A)"), and the Admiralty of the Noorderkwartier in the north of Holland (indicated by "(N)"). The fifth was the Admiralty of Friesland covering the Province of Friesland (indicated by "(F)"), albeit with fewer ships than the other four Admiralties. Each Dutch warship belonged exclusively to one or other of the five Admiralties, although in the 17th century the Dutch fleet included many ships of mercantile ownership, particularly those belonging to the Dutch East India Company (VOC). The names of Dutch warships were often common to several Admiralties, so that there were vessels bearing the same name in different Admiralties at the same time.

Armament was often changed, so the number of guns mounted in any ship frequently varied from year to year. During the 1650 - 1680 period, many Dutch ships of the line were "up-gunned", ending with significantly more guns than when they first came into service.

The Dutch Rating System
Prior to the first Anglo-Dutch War, the Dutch did not have a system of categorising vessels beyond a simple functional division into "ships", "frigates" and lesser ship-rigged "three-mast yachts". The former coincided with the English categories of 1st to 4th Rates, i.e. they comprised the battlefleet units. In 1652 the Dutch - under pressure from their naval commander Maarten Tromp to build larger ships to combat the English - introduced a rating system which was based on a series of Charters, initially grading the battlefleet units by length of ship with classes of (Amsterdam) feet, 136 feet and 140 feet; this was at a time when the largest ship in the Dutch navies measured 134 feet in length.  Subsequently, having won the Battle of Dungeness in November 1652, Tromp persuaded the Staten-Generaal to add a further class of 150 feet ships as the "1st Charter", although only two of this length were built initially - the Eendracht and Groot Hollandia, both launched at Rotterdam in 1653 and 1654 respectively with 58 guns each.

Between 1652 and 1680 the "Charters" underwent drastic revision, but it was still more appropriate to classify ships of the line during this era by their (gundeck) length than by the number of guns carried. The lengths remained the basis of the Charters. By 1680, following the end of the later Anglo-Dutch Wars, the Staten-Generaal divided the warships of the five Admiralties into eight charters. The first four charters comprised the battlefleet, while the other four (5th to 8th Charters) covered frigates and smaller cruising warships. The 1st Charter comprised the largest two-deckers before 1680, then subsequently covered the three-deckers (for which see note below). These were ships carrying more than 70 guns, although this had risen to about 80 guns by 1670 and by 1680 to encompass ships of 90 guns or more. They generally (but not always) carried a mix of 36-pounder and 24-pounder guns on their primary (lower) gun deck, with lighter cannon (18-pounders and 12-pounders) on the upper deck and 6-pounders on their quarterdecks.

The other battlefleet Charters were all two-decked warships. By the 1670s the 2nd Charter were all two-decker warships with a number of guns initially around 60 to 74, although by 1680 the 60-gun and 64-gun ships had been relegated to the 3rd Charter. They usually carried 18-pounders (or a mixture of 24-pounders and 18-pounders) on the lower deck. The 3rd and 4th Charter ships usually carried 18-pounders or 12-pounders as their main battery.  The 4th Charter ships by 1680 carried between 44 and 56 guns; by 1714 a minimum of 50 guns applied.

Dimensions
All lengths quoted in this article are measured in Amsterdam feet, taken as the length of the uppermost continuous deck from stem to stern. The Amsterdam foot (Amsterdamse voet) was equivalent to 28.3133 cm, and thus equated to 0.9289 of an English foot, a factor to bear in mind in any comparisons. It was divided into eleven inches (Amsterdamse duim) equal to 2.57393 cm, compared with 2.54 cm for an English inch. Thus 150 Amsterdam feet equated to 139ft 4 inches in English measurement. The Rotterdam foot was considerably longer - 31.39 cm (equal to almost 1.03 English feet) - and was divided into twelve inches, each of 2.615 cm.

Three-deckers
Most of the Dutch ships of the line, for reasons given above, were built with two decks of guns. However, in the 1660s four ships of the Amsterdam Admiralty were built which were structurally three-deckers (the Spiegel of 1663, followed by the Gouden Leeuw, Witte Olifant and Dolphijn of 1666), but these had only partially-armed upper decks, with guns mounted forwards and aft (under the quarterdeck) but not in the waist at this level. From 1682 twenty complete three-deckers were built, the last in 1721; these comprised the 1st Charter issued on 15 February 1680, and provided for these to have dimensions of 170 (Amsterdam) feet on the gundeck (146 ft 3 in on the keel) x 43 feet x 16 ft. After these twenty, no further 1st Charter ships were built by the Netherlands.

Ships of the "Old Navy" (1579 to 1652) 
This is the period during which the Dutch provinces consolidated their independence from Spanish rule, forming the United Provinces of the Netherlands, and took part in the Eighty Years' War. Ships of this era are not separated by Charter or Rate, as the categorisation system did not operate before 1652. The ships owned by the five Admiralties which were 120 (Amsterdam) feet as measured on the upper deck are listed; these were supplemented frequently by ships hired from the VOC or other mercantile source (this was particularly true in 1652, at the outbreak of the 1st Anglo-Dutch War), but only a few of these are mentioned.
 (N) Eenhoorn 34 guns (1623, 125 ft) - 1655
 (M) Aemilia 46 guns (1632, 144 ft) - transferred to France 1643 as a privateer, captured by Spain and broken up 1647
 (Z) Middelburg 30 guns (1632, 125 ft)
 (A) Utrecht 32 guns (1633) - Blew up on 28 September 1648
 (R) Gelderland 40 guns (1634, 128 ft) - 1659
 (A) Frederik Hendrik 36 guns (1636)
 (A) Zutphen 30 guns (1636, 125 ft)
 (A) Bommel 30 guns (1637, 120 ft) - broken up in 1655
 (F) Breda 28 guns (1637 purchase from VOC, 120 ft) - captured by Sweden in the Battle of the Sound in 1658
 (N) Eendracht 42 guns (1639, 130 ft) - sunk in action 1676
 (A) Zon (or Vergulde Zon) 40 guns (1640, 124 ft)
 (A) Edam 38 guns (1641, 124 ft) - captured by English Navy on 4 June 1669, becoming HMS Black Bull
 (A) Groningen 40 guns (1641, 125 ft)
 (A) Goes (or Ter Goes) 40 guns (1641, 124 ft)
 (A) Graaf Willem 40 guns (1641, 125 ft) - captured by England at the Battle of the Gabbard, 1653
 (N) Prinses Roijaal 40 guns (1641, 1254 ft)
 (R) Prinses Roijaal Maria 36 guns (1643, 124 ft)  - captured by England in June 1652, renamed Princess Maria
 (A) Gewapende Ruyter (captured French Villeroi) 36 guns (1650) - Captured by England 1652
 (A) Maan 40 guns (1643, 125 ft) - broken up 1656
 (A) Verenigde Provincië (or Zeven Provinciën) 40 guns (1643, 128 ft) - broken up 1665
 (A) Zeelandia 34 guns (1643, 120 ft) - sunk in action 12 December 1677
 (Z) Vlissingen 32 guns (1643, 130 ft)
 (R) Brederode 54 guns (1644, 144 ft) - Gradually upgunned to 59 guns, captured and sunk in the Battle of the Sound on 8 November 1658
 (A) Haarlem 40 guns (1644, 128 ft) - broken up 1667
 (A) Leeuwarden 34 guns (1645, 121 ft) - hired to Venice 1655
 (A) Jaarsveld  44 guns (1648, 130 ft) - Wrecked 9 February 1653
 (A) Vrede 44 guns (1650, 131½ ft) - broken up 1667
 (A) Huis van Nassau 36 guns (1651) - captured from Portugal 1651 and sold same year
 (A) Vrijheid 46 guns (1651, 134 ft) - sunk in action at Battle of Palermo on 2 June 1676

Hired East India Company (VOC) ships
 Mercurius 36 guns (1653, 122½ ft) - East Indiaman. Sunk at the Battle of Scheveningen, 1653
 Louisa Hendrika 45 - East Indiaman, served as warship
 Vogelstruis 40 guns (1652, 160 ft) - East Indiaman, hired about July 1652
 Witte Lam 28 (1652, 127 ft) - East Indiaman, hired in March 1652, but discarded by December.
 Groote Liefde 38 (1652, 132 ft) - East Indiaman, hired in March 1652. Captured by England at Battle of Portland in 1653, renamed Great Charity; retaken by the Dutch at Battle of Lowestoft in 1665.

Ships of the "New Navy" (1652 to 1682) 
This is the period during which the United Provinces fought three Anglo-Dutch Wars - conflicts of 1652-1656, 1665-1667 and 1672-1674; although England withdrew from this contest in 1674, the Dutch remained at war against the French until 1678. The Charter (rating) system was introduced in 1652 - initially defined by ships' lengths - but was radically revised during this era (see notes above).

At the start of the 1st Anglo-Dutch War, the Dutch navies relied heavily on hired ships to expand their fleet, but a programme to build thirty new ships of the line was promptly started. This comprised a flagship of 150 (Amsterdam) feet in length (the Eendracht of 1653), and twenty-nine other ships of 130 feet or more. It was followed within a year by a second thirty-ship programme, again consisting of a flagship of 150 (Amsterdam) feet in length (the Groot Hollandia of 1654), and twenty-nine other ships of 130 feet or more.

1st Charter (150 feet length) 
The first two of these were launched for the Maas Admiralty in 1653 and 1654. The first was originally intended to be named Prins Willem, but Willem himself ruled that it should bear the name Eendracht ("Concord") to honour the relationship between the seven provinces which constituted the United Netherlands.
 (M) Eendracht 58 guns originally, 72 by 1665 (1653). Designed by Jan Salomonszoon van den Tempel, built at Dordrecht - sunk (by magazine explosion) at Battle of Lowestoft on 13 June 1665
 (M) Groot Hollandia 58 guns originally (1654). Designed by Jan Salomonszoon van den Tempel, built at Dordrecht - sold in 1687

Other ships of 130 feet or more

Built 1653
 (M) Prins Hendrik 44 guns (130 ft). Built by Jacon Hermanszoon Wittert. Last mention in 1656 for expedition to Danzig, under command of Aert van Nes.
 (A) Maarseveen (130 ft)
 (F) Prinses Albertina (130 ft)
 (M) Utrecht (130 ft)
 (Z) Zeelandia (136 ft)
 (Z) Hof van Zeeland (136 ft)
 (A) Landman (130 ft)
 (A) Stad en Lande (130 ft)
 (A) Stavoren (130 ft)
 (Z) Dordrecht (130 ft)
 (Z) Utrecht (134 ft)
 (F) Westergo (134 ft)
 (N) Wapen van Holland 50 guns (134 ft)
 (Z) Veere (130 ft) - (also called Ter Veere, or Wapen van Ter Veere)
 (Z) Zierikzee (130 ft)
 (Z) Vlissingen (130 ft)
 (F) Oostergo (140 ft)
 (A) Oosterwijk (140 ft)
 (F) Stad en Lande (134 ft)
 (A) Zuiderhuis (130 ft)
 (A) Jaarsveld 44 guns (130 ft) - flagship of Johan van Galen at the Battle of Montecristo
 (A) Burcht van Leiden (132½ ft)
 (N) Jupiter (128 ft)
 (N) Jozua 60 guns (136 ft)
 (A) Amsterdam (140 ft)
 (Z) Middelburg (130 ft)
 (A) Huis te Kruiningen (140 ft) - originally ordered for Genoa, and purchased by the Amsterdam Admiralty on the stocks.
 (A) Huis te Zwieten (146 ft) - originally ordered for Genoa, and purchased by the Amsterdam Admiralty on the stocks. Given to the VOC, rearmed with 70 guns, captured by England at the Battle of Lowestoft, 1665

Built 1654-1659
 (M) Prins Willem 44 guns (134 ft)
 (A) Doesburg (130 ft)
 (A) Duivervoorde (130 ft)
 (M) Klein Hollandia 52 guns (134 ft) - sunk in action 1672, defending the Smyrna convoy
 (A) Prins te Paard (136 ft)
 (A) Gouden Leeuw (134 ft)
 (F) Elf Steden (130 ft)
 (N) Alkmaar (or Burgh van Alkmaar) 32 guns (130 ft)
 (N) Caleb 42 guns (132 ft)
 (N) Hollandsche Tuin 56 guns (134 ft)
 (N) Gelderland (136 ft)
 (N) Wapen van Nassau (134 ft)
 (N) Drie Helden Davids (130 ft)
 (F) Omlandia (130 ft)
 (A) Dom van Utrecht (130 ft)
 (A) Tromp (130 ft)
 (A) Tijdverdrijf (136 ft)
 (A) Stad Gouda (130 ft)
 (M) Gelderland (134 ft) - later renamed Prins Mauritz
 (A) Raadhuis van Haarlem (130 ft)

Other ships of the line (less than 130 ft)
Note that this list is incomplete and will be extended.
 (F) Klein Frisia (120 ft)
 (M) Prins Maurits (ex-Gelderland) 39 guns (119¾ ft). Built 1653-54 by Jacob Wittert at Rotterdam. Burnt by the English at the Battle of Lowestoft in 1665.
 (M) Prins Willem 44 guns (127 ft 7 in). Built 1654 at Delfshaven.
 (M) Brielle (127 ft 7in)
 (M) Dordrecht (or Wapen van Dordrecht) 42 guns (127½ ft). Built 1655 at Rotterdam. Not mentioned after 1665.
 (M) Rotterdam 26 guns (127ft 7in)

Built 1660 to 1680
With the outbreak of the Second Anglo-Dutch War, the Staten-Generaal ordered the construction of twenty-four large ships, with a second group of twenty-four being added soon after. This programme, which was all built in the period 1664 to 1667, included ten ships of 160 (Amsterdam) feet length or more, now forming the 1st Charter.

1st Charter 
 (A) Hollandia 82 guns (1665, 165 ft) - Cornelis Tromp's flagship at the St James Day Battle, sold to be broken up in 1694
 (M) Zeven Provinciën 80 guns (1665, 163 ft) - Michiel de Ruyter's flagship at the St James Day Battle, broken up 1694
 (N) Pacificatie 80 (1665, 160 ft) - Volckert Schram's flagship at the St James Day Battle
 (M) Eendracht 76-80 (1666, 160 ft) - Aert van Nes's flagship at the St James Day Battle
 (N) Westfriesland 78 (1666, 160 ft)- Jan Meppel's flagship at the St James Day Battle
 (A) Gouden Leeuw 80 (1666, 170 ft) - Cornelis Tromp's flagship at the Battle of Texel
 (A) Olifant (or Witte Oliphant) 80 (1666, 171 ft)
 (A) Dolphijn 84 (1667, 171 ft)
 (M) Voorzichtigheid 80-84 (1667, 165 ft) - renamed (rebuilt?) Wakende Kraan in 1677
 (M) Vrijheid 80 (1667, 165 ft)

2nd Charter and below 
This list includes ships of the line built (all for the Amsterdam Admiralty) in the period 1661 to 1663, prior to the outbreak of the Second Anglo-Dutch War.
 (A) Liefde 70 (1661, 140 ft) - broken up 1666
 (A) Geloof 60 (1661, 140 ft) - broken up 1676
 (A) Wakende Boei 48 (1661, 130 ft) - broken up 1675
 (A) Harderwijk 46 (1662, 133 ft) - broken up 1693
 (A) Provincie van Utrecht 60 (1663, 145 ft) - broken up 1691
 (A) Waasdorp 68 (1663, 150 ft) - broken up 1666
 (A) Spiegel 70 (1663, 156 ft) - broken up 1676
 (A) Akerboom 60 (1664, 140 ft) - wrecked 1689
 (A) Gideon 60 (1664, 140 ft) - broken up 1689
 (A) Steenbergen 64 (1664, 150 ft) - sunk at Battle of Palermo in 1676
 (N) Monnikendam 62 (1664, 140 ft) - wrecked 1683
 (N) Noorderkwartier 60 (1664, 136 ft) - sold 1686
 (A) Kalandsoog 68 (1665, 150 ft) - broken up 1691
 (A) Deventer 62 (1665, 148 or 150 ft) - wrecked 1673
 (F) Vredewold 60 (1665, 140 ft)
 (A) Gouden Leeuwen 50 (1665, 141 ft)
 (A) Beschermer 54 (1665, 141¾ ft)
 (A) Essen 50 (1665, 142 ft)
 (Z) Zierikzee 60 (1665, 145 ft)
 (M) Delfland 70 (1665)
 (F) Frisia (or Groot Frisia) 74 (1665, 150 ft)
 (F) Prins Hendrik Casimir 74 (1665, 150 ft)
 (A) Wapen van Utrecht 62 (1665, 152 ft)
 (A) Gouda 72 (1665, 157½ ft)
 (A) Komeetster 70 (1665, 152½ ft))
 (A) Reigersbergen (or Blauwe Reiger) 74 (1665, 156 ft)
 (Z) Walcheren 70 (1665, 155 ft)
 (Z) Gekroonde Burgh 70 (1666, 150 ft)
 (M) Ridderschap 72 (1666, 150 ft)
 (N) Wapen van Enkhuizen 72 (1665, 150 ft)
 (F) Groningen 72 (1666, 150 ft)
 (F) Zevenvolden 76 (1666)
 (F) Sneek 65 (1666, 150 ft)
 (Z) Tholen 60 (1666, 145 ft)
 (Z) Domburg 60 (1666, 145 ft)
 (N) Alkmaar 62 (1666, 140 ft)
 (M) Schieland 54 (1666, 140 ft)
 (M) Wassenaar 56 (1666, 140 ft)
 (M) Gelderland 72 (1666, 150 ft)
 (M) Maagd van Dordrecht 68 (1666, 150 ft)
 (N) Prins van Oranje (or Jonge Prins) 62 (1666, 150 ft)
 (N) Eenhoorn (or Wapen van Hoorn) 70 (1667)
 (A) Woerden 72 (1667, 150 ft)
 (N) Monnikendam 70 (1671)
 (A) Oudshoorn 70 (1672)

Note the earlier Oudshoorn of 70 guns was the prize Swiftsure captured from the English  at the Four Days Battle in 1666

Prizes and purchases
 Carolus Quintus (Charles V) (East Indiaman) 52 (1665)
 (Z) Zwanenburg 48 (ex-English St Patrick, captured on 5 February 1667)

Ships of the "Expanded Navy" (1682 to 1714) 
This is the period during which the United Provinces fought in alliance with the English Navy against the French fleet of Louis XIV. By the start of the 1680s, the ships of the 1660s were wearing out, and in 1682 a programme of 36 new ships was authorised by the Staten-Generaal. In 1685 a long-term plan for a battlefleet of 96 ships was agreed in principle (to comprise 20 of the 1st Charter, 28 of the 2nd, 24 of the 3rd and 24 of the 4th), although this target was never fully achieved.

1st Charter 
These were all three-deckers, with standard dimensions (all in Amsterdam feet) of 170 ft on the upper deck, 146¼ ft on the keel, 43 ft in breadth and 16 ft depth in hold. In later ships this standard was stretched to a greater length. The typical armament for one of these ships was 28 x 24pdrs on the lower deck, 28 x 18pdrs on the middle deck, 28 x 12pdrs on the upper deck and 8 x 6pdrs on the quarterdeck; however, this varied sometimes.
 (Z) Zeelandia 90-94 guns (1682, 170 ft)
 (N) Westfriesland 90-94 guns (1682, 170 ft)
 (M) Admiraal Generaal (or Kapitein Generaal) 86 guns (1683, 170 ft) - Discarded 1704
 (A) Prinses Maria 92 guns (1683, 170 ft) - sold to be broken up in 1708
 (A) Prins Willem 92 guns (1687, 170 ft) - broken up in 1717 or 1718
 (N) Kasteel van Medemblik 90-94 guns (1688, 170 ft)
 (M) Koning Willem 92-94 guns (1688, 170 ft)
 (A) Keurvorst van Brandenburg 92 guns (1689, 170 ft) - Renamed Koning van Pruisen ('King of Prussia') in 1701, broken up in 1715
 (A) Keurvorstin van Brandenburg 92 guns (1689, 170 ft) - Renamed Koningin van Pruisen ('Queen of Prussia') in 1701, broken up in 1713
 (A) Keurvorst van Saksen 92 guns (1689, 170 ft)
 (N) Beschermer 96 (1690, 170 ft))
 (M) Beschermer 90 guns (1691, 174 ft) - sold to be broken up in 1715
 (Z) Middelburg 80 guns (1691)
 (A) Unie 94 (1692, 173 ft) - broken up 1721
 (M) Zeven Provinciën 90-94 guns (1694, 170 ft) - stranded in 1705, wreck sold 1706
 (A) Vrijheid 96 gund (1695, 176 ft) - sold to be broken up in 1723
 (Z) Middelburg 80-88 guns (1699, 180 ft)
 (M) Eendracht 100 guns (1703, 181 ft)
 (A) Amsterdam 96 guns (1712, 176 ft) - sold 1738 as useless

Note that, although the 1685 long-term Plan had called for twenty ships of the 1st Charter to be built, the twentieth and last Dutch three-decker - the Amsterdam Admiralty's 96-gun Haarlem (of 177 ft) was not built until 1721.

2nd Charter 
These were all two-deckers, with standard dimensions (all in Amsterdam feet) of 156 ft on the upper deck, 133½ ft on the keel, 41 ft in breadth and 15 ft depth in hold. In later ships this standard was stretched to a greater length. A typical armament for one of these ships was 26 x 18pdrs on the lower deck, 26 x 12pdrs on the upper deck, 18 x 6pdrs on the quarterdeck and 4 x 3pdrs on the poop
 (A) Gelderland 74 (1683, 156 ft) - sold to be broken up in 1708
 (A) Hollandia 74 guns (1683, 156 ft)
 (M) Maas 70 guns (1683, 156 ft) sold to be broken up in 1704
 (N) Noorderkwartier 72 guns (1688, 156 ft)
 (N) Noorderkwartier 74 guns (1690, 156 ft) - taken to pieces in 1712
 (N) Maagd van Enkhuizen 72 guns (1690, 156 ft) - burnt at Battle of Beachy Head (1690)
 (A) Elswout 74 guns (1691, 156 ft)
 (Z) Eerste Edele 72 guns (1691, 156 ft)
 (Z) Walcheren 72 guns (1691, 152 ft)
 (N) Enkhuizen 72 guns (1691, 156 ft)
 (M) Ridderschap 72 guns (1691, 156 ft)
 (M) Rotterdam 72 guns (1691, 156 ft)
 (M) Hollandia 74 guns (1692, 156 ft) - sold to be broken up in 1716
 (M) Dordrecht 74 guns (1692, 156 ft)
 (A) Reigersbergen (or Wapen van Reigersbergen) 74 guns (1692, 156 ft) - wrecked in 1692, replaced by next ship
 (A) Reigersbergen 74 guns (1693, 156 ft) - broken up in 1721
 (A) Slot van Muiden 74 guns (1693, 156 ft) - broken up about 1722
 (N) Alkmaar (or Wapen van Alkmaar) 70 guns (1693, 156 ft)
 (A) Catwijk 74 guns (1694, 156 ft)
 (A) Deventer 74 guns (1694, 156 ft) - broken up in 1720
 (A) Nijmegen (or Stad Nimwegen) 74 guns (1694, 156 ft) - broken up in 1722
 (A) Hollandia 74 guns (1702 or 1703, 161 ft) - broken up in 1725
 (A) Provincie van Utrecht 74 guns (1702 or 1703, 161 ft) - broken up in 1725
 (M) Rotterdam 74 guns (1703, 156 ft)
 (M) Maas 74 guns (1707-08, 160 ft)
 (A) Zeelandia 74 guns (1710, 161 ft)
 (A) Gelderland 74 guns (1711, 161 ft) - sold to Portugal in 1717
 (A) Leiden 72 guns (1714, 161 ft) - sold to be broken up in 1752-54

3rd Charter 
These were also all two-deckers, with standard dimensions (all in Amsterdam feet) of 145 ft on the upper deck, 123½ ft on the keel, 37½ ft in breadth and 14¼ ft depth in hold. In later ships this standard was stretched to a greater length. A typical armament was 24 x 18pdrs on the lower deck, 24 x 12pdrs on the upper deck, and 16 x 6pdrs on the quarterdeck.
 (Z) Veere 60-62 guns (1682, 145 or 147 ft)
 (A) Zeelandia 62 guns (1685, 145 ft)
 (A) Friesland 62 guns (1685, 145 ft) - lost at the Battle of Beachy Head in 1690
 (A) Leiden 64 guns (1687, 145 ft) - broken up in 1712
 (A) Haarlem 64 guns (1688, 145 ft) - broken up in 1712
 (Z) Zierikzee 64 guns (1688, 146 ft)
 (M) Veluwe 68 guns (1688, 153 ft) - sold to be broken up in 1705
 (A) Amsterdam guns 64 guns (1688, 145 ft)
 (Z) Tholen 60 guns (1688, 145 ft) - lost at Battle of Beachy Head in 1690
 (A) Banier 64 guns (1691, 145 ft)
 (M) Wassenaar 66 guns (1692, 145 ft)
 (M) Schieland 54 guns (1693, 146 ft) - sold in 1712 or 1720
 (M) Zeelandia 66 guns (1693, 145 ft)
 (N) Utrecht 64 guns (1693, 145 ft)
 (N) Arnhem (or Wapen van Arnhem) 64 guns (1693, 145 ft)
 (A) Het Loo (or 't Loo) 64 guns (1693, 145 ft)
 (M) Overijssel 55 guns (1694, 145 ft)
 (A) Dieren guns  64 (1694, 145 ft)
 (A) Dom van Utrecht 64 guns (1694, 150 ft)
 (F) Prince Friso 68 guns (1694, 145 ft)
 (M) Delft 54 guns (1699, 146 ft)
 (M) Schieland 54 guns (1699, 146 ft)
 (A) Gouda 64 guns (1698, 148 ft) - sold to be broken up in 1720
 (A) Aemilia 60 guns (1699, 148 ft
 (Z) Nassau 64 guns (1698, 147½ ft)
 (M) Gelderland 64 guns (1699, 151 ft)
 (A) Leeuw 64 guns (1700, 150 ft)
 (A) Raadhuis van Edam 64 guns (1700, 150 ft)
 (M) Lepelaar 52 guns (1703, 145 ft)
 (M) Groot Heeresveld 64 guns (1707-08, 153 ft)
 (M) Starrenburg (1708, 153 ft)
 (A) Prins Friso (1708, 150 ft)
 (N) Buis 64 guns (1709, 150 ft)
 (A) Loosdrecht 64 guns (1710, 150 ft) - sold to be broken up in 1739
 (A) Boetzelaar 64 guns (1711, 152 ft) - sold to be broken up in 1739

4th Charter 
These too were two-deckers, with standard dimensions (all in Amsterdam feet) of 135 ft on the upper deck, 115 ft on the keel, 35 ft in breadth and 14 ft depth in hold. In later ships this standard was stretched to a greater length. A typical armament for one of these ships was 22 x 18pdrs on the lower deck, 22 x 8pdrs on the upper deck, and 8 x 4pdrs on the quarterdeck.
 (A) Vrede? 50 (1681)
 (N) Eenhoorn (or Wapen van Hoorn) 40 (1682, 135 ft)
 (A) Stad en Lande 50 guns (1682) - captured by France on 29 June 1694 (while on lease to Friesland Admiralty)
 (Z) Tholen 54 guns (1682, 135 ft) - blew up by accident in 1687
 (M) Honslaardijk (or Huis van Honslaarsdijk) 48 guns (1683, 135 ft) - captured by France in 1698
 (A) Beemster 50 guns (1686, 138 ft)
 (A) Castricum 52 guns (1686) - captured by France on 21 August 1692 (while on lease to Friesland Admiralty)
 (Z) Kortgene 50 guns (1687)
 (Z) Goes (or Ter Goes) 54 guns (1688, 136 ft)
 (Z) Vlissingen 54 guns (1688, 136 ft)
 (A) Gasterland 52 guns (1688, 135 ft) - captured by the French on 22 May 1703
 (M) Schiedam 54 guns (1689, 135 ft)
 (M) Provincie van Utrecht 50 guns (1689, 135 ft)
 (N) Tijger? 52 (1689)
 (A) Beschermer (or Wapen van de Schermer) 52 guns (1690, 130 ft) - captured by the French on 22 May 1703
 (A) Ooststellingwerf 52 guns (1691, 135 ft)
 (M) Delft 54 guns (1691, 135 ft) - captured by France in 1697
 (A) Ripperda 52 guns (1691, 135 ft) - hulked 1719, sold to be broken up in 1736
 (A) Muiderberg 52 guns (1693, 135 ft) - captured by the French on 22 May 1703
 (A) Damieten 50 guns (1693, 135 ft)
 (F) Prins Friso 56 guns (1693, 135 ft) - captured by France on 29 June 1694, replaced by new 68-gun 3rd Charter ship in 1594
 (F) Amalia (or Prinses Amalia) 56 guns (1693, 135 ft)
 (F) Friesland (or Wapen van Friesland) 58 guns, 145 ft (1694)
 (A) Ster (or Morgan Ster) 52 guns (1694, 138 ft)
 (A) Zon 52 guns (1694, 138 ft) - broken up in 1723
 (A) Maan 52 guns (1694, 138 ft)
 (M) Brielle 52 guns (1695, 124 ft)
 (M) Rotterdam 52 (1695, 124 ft) - captured by the French in on 22 May 1703
 (N) Wapen van Medemblik 50 guns (1696, 135 ft)
 (A) Overijssel 52 guns (1696, 145 ft) - broken up in 1728
 (A) Wulverhorst 52 guns (1696, 145 ft) - captured and burnt by the French on 19 May 1705
 (Z) Veere (or Ter Veere) 52-54 guns (1697, 143 ft)
 (A) Hardenbroek 52 guns (1698, 139 ft) - captured by the French on 2 October 1706, sold to Russia as Esperans
 (A) Batavier 52 guns (1699, 140 ft)
 (A) Hof van Rhenen (or Hof Rhenen) 52 guns (1700, 140 ft)
 (A) Keizerswaard 52 guns (1700, 140 ft) - broken up in 1728
 (A) Nieuwenhuis 52 guns (1700, 140 ft) - broken up in 1731
 (N) Deventer (or Wapen van Deventer) 52 guns (1700, 140 ft)
 (M) Overijssel 54 guns (1703-04, 140 ft)
 (M) Seepelaar? 54 (1703)
 (M) Matenes 54 guns (1704, 145 ft)
 (A) Curacao 52 guns (1704, 145 ft) - wrecked on 31 May 1729
 (A) Oosterwijk 52 guns (1704, 145 ft) - sold to be broken up in 1734
 (N) Zandvoort 56 (1708)
 (N) Wolfswinkel 52 (1708)
 (N) Huis Te Neck 50 guns (1709, 140 ft)
 (A) Brakel (or Den Brakel) 52 guns (1709, 142 ft)
 (A) Duinrel (or Duinveld) 52 guns (1712, 145 ft) - hulked in 1736
 (A) Ter Meer 52 guns (1712 or 1713, 145 ft) - sold to be broken up in 1741

Uncertain 
 Akerboom 60 (c. 1684)
 (A) Gaasterland 52 (1688) - Captured by France on 22 May 1703
 (N) Buis 64 (1690)
 (A) Buren 64 (1694)
 Overwinnaer (c. 1706) - Captured by France 1708 as Grand Vainqueur, sold to Russia as Viktoria
 (M) Starrenburg 64 (1708)
 Schonauwen (c. 1710) - Captured by France 1711 as Beau Parterre, sold to Russia, captured by Sweden 1714 as Kronskepp

Ships of the Dutch Navies 1715 to 1775 
This is the period during which the reduced Dutch forces maintained their strength at a lesser level from the conclusion of the War of the Spanish Succession. Ships of this era have not been separated by Charter in the list below.

1st Charter
 (A) Haarlem 96 guns (1721)

2nd Charter
 (A) Gelderland 72 guns (1717)
 (A) Gouda 72 guns (1719)
 (A) Hollandia 72 guns (1725)
 (|) Maas 74 guns (1728)
 (A) Vrijheid 72 guns (1731)
 (A) Haarlem 72 guns (1736)
 (M) Prins Willem ?74 guns (1746)
 (A) Prinses Roijaal 74 guns (1759)
 (A) Admiraal Generaal 74 guns (1764)

3rd Charter
 (A) Purmer 64 guns (1715)
 (A) Roozendaal 64 guns (1717)
 (A) Zoeterwoude (or Soeterwoude) 64 guns (1719)
 (N) Kasteel van Egmont 64 guns (1722)
 (Z) Tholen 64 guns (1723)
 (A) Heemstede 64 guns (1724)
 (N) Kasteel van Medenblick 64 guns (1725)
 (A) Provincie van Utrecht 64 guns (1728)
 (Z) Zierikzee 64 guns (1733)
 (A) Damiaten 64 guns (1741)
 (M) Rotterdam 66 guns (1741)
 (A) Batavier 64 guns (1746)
 (Z) Zuidbeveland 64 guns (1746)
 (A) Eendracht 64 guns (1747)
 (A) Nassau 64 guns (1759)
 (A) Holland 64 guns (1761)
 (M) Rotterdam 60 guns (1761)
 (M) Mars 68 guns (1763)
 (A) Amsterdam 68 guns (1763)
 (A) Prinses Roijaal Frederika Sophia Wilhelmina 64 guns (1769)

4th Charter
 (A) Polanen 52 guns (1722)
 (A) Damiaten 52 guns (1723)
 (M) Twickel 56 guns (1725)
 (A) Valkenburg 52 guns (1725)
 (A) Beemsterlust 52 guns (1725)
 (N) Ramhorst 52 guns (1725)
 (A) Boekenroode 52 guns (1729)
 (F) Prins Friso 50 guns (1730)
 (M) Delft 56 guns (1731)
 (A) Brederode 52 guns (1731)
 (A) Moriaanshoofd 52 guns (1733)
 (A) Watervliet 52 guns (1733)
 (Z) Goes (or Ter Goes) 58 guns (1733)
 (Z) Vlissingen 58 guns (1734)
 (A) Assendelft 52 guns (1736)
 (M) Dordrecht 54 guns (1739)
 (A) Burcht van Leiden 52 guns (1740)
 (A) Edam 52 guns (1741) - lost in 1741 and replaced by next ship
 (A) Edam 52 guns (1742)
 (A) Leeuwenhorst 52 guns (1742)
 (Z) Veere 54 guns (1745)
 (M) Schiedam 56 guns (1745)
 (M) Prinses Carolina 54 guns (1748)
 (A) Rhijnland 54 guns (1753)
 (A) Glindhorst 54 guns (1754)
 (A) Schieland 54 guns (1755)
 (A) Nassau Weilburg 56 guns (1760) - wrecked 1783
 (F) Prinses Maria-Louisa 54 guns (1761) - Sold to be broken up 1781
 (A) Kennemerland 54 guns (1761) - burnt 1778
 (M) Rotterdam 52 guns (1761) - captured by the British on 5 January 1781
 (A) Prinses Louisa 56 guns (1769) - renamed Broederschap by the Batavian Republic, captured by the British in the Vlieter (off Texel) on 30 August 1799 and renamed Broaderscarp
 (A) Erf Prins 56 guns (1770) - wrecked 1783
 (A) Admiraal Piet Heijn 56 guns (1774) - sold to be broken up in 1799

Ships of the Dutch Navies 1776 to 1795 
In the period of higher international tension, culminating in the Fourth Anglo-Dutch War, a massive effort to renew the Dutch navies was undertaken. No three-deckers were built, hence no "Ist Charter" is listed. This period continues until the French occupation of December 1794 to February 1795, following which the five separate Admiralties were replaced on 27 February 1795 by a single committee dealing with all navy affairs. The list below is continued beyond 1795 to include other ships originally ordered for the United Netherlands but subsequently brought into service for the (French dominated) Batavian Republic.

2nd Charter 
The ships of the 2nd Charter each carried 74 guns. In general, they measured 179 (Amsterdam) feet on the upper deck (equivalent to 166ft on the upper deck (equivalent to 166ft 2in in British units of measurement), with a breadth of 49 Amsterdam feet (45½ British feet) and a depth in hold of 20 Amsterdam feet (18½ British feet).
 (A) Neptunus 74 guns (1782) - condemned 1794
 (A) Jupiter 74 guns (1782) - captured by the British at the Battle of Camperdown on 11 October 1797 and became HMS Camperdown
 (F) Stad en Lande 74 guns (1782) - broken up 1792
 (F) Friesland 74 guns (1783) - broken up 1792
 (N) Zeven Provinciën 74 guns (1783) - sold to be broken up 1794
 (A) Vrijheid 74 guns (1783) - captured by the British at the Battle of Camperdown on 11 October 1797
 (A) Prins Maurits 74 guns (1783) - captured in 1797
 (M) Willem de Eerste 74 guns (1785) - renamed Brutus in 1795 by the Batavian Republic, then Noord Brabant in 1806 under French control; sold to be broken up in 1820
 (M) Staaten Generaal 74 guns (1788) - renamed Bato in 1798 by the Batavian Republic - run ashore and burnt at Simon's Bay on 10 January 1806 to avoid capture by the British

Note a further 74-gun ship begun at Amsterdam in 1795 (and thus not for the pre-1795 United Provinces) was launched on 9 August 1796 for the Batavian Republic as Washington - captured by the British in the Vlieter (off Texel) on 28 August 1799 and became HMS Princess of Orange.

3rd Charter 
The ships of the 3rd Charter each carried between 64 and 68 guns. In general, they measured between 167 and 168 (Amsterdam) feet on the upper deck (equivalent to 155ft to 156ft in British units of measurement), with a breadth of 46¾ to 47 Amsterdam feet (about 42ft 10in to 43ft 7in British feet) and a depth in hold of 19 Amsterdam feet (17½ British feet).
 (F) Admiraal de Ruiter 68 guns (1778) - captured by the British in the Vlieter (off Texel) on 30 August 1799
 (M) Prins Frederik 68 guns (1779) - renamed Revolutie in 1796 by the Batavian Republic, captured in Saldanha Bay 17 August 1796 by the British
 (A) Unie 68 guns (1781) - wrecked 1782
 (M) Wassenaer 68 guns (1781) - captured by the British at the Battle of Camperdown (Camperduin), 11 October 1797
 (A) Gelderland 68 guns (1781) - captured by the British in the Vlieter (off Texel) on 30 August 1799
 (A) Utrecht 68 guns (1781) - captured by the British in the Vlieter (off Texel) on 30 August 1799
 (M) Hercules 66 guns (1781) - captured by the British at the Battle of Camperdown (Camperduin), 11 October 1797
 (M) Kortenaer 64 guns (1781)
 (A) Drente 68 guns (1782) - sold to be broken up in 1794
 (A) Overijssel 68 guns (1782) - wrecked in 1786
 (F) Admiraal Tjerk Hiddes de Vries 68 guns (1782) - captured by the British at the Battle of Camperdown (Camperduin), 11 October 1797
 (A) Holland 68 guns (1782) - wrecked 1786
 (N) Hoop 64 guns (1783) - broken up 1794
 (N) Westfriesland 64 guns (1783) - broken up 1795
 (N) Hersteller 68 guns (1783) - broken up 1795
 (N) Noord Holland 68 guns (1783) - sold to be broken up 1795
 (M) Dordrecht 68 guns (1783) - captured by the British in Saldanha Bay on 17 August 1796
 (M) Rotterdam 68 guns (1783) - sold 1799
 (M) Prins Willem 64 guns (1783) - broken up 1795
 (F) Oostergo 68 guns (1783) - not mentioned after 1794
 (F) Westergo 68 guns (1784) - condemned 1795
 (Z) Zeeland 68 guns (1784) - captured by the British at Plymouth on 4 March 1796
 (F) Zevenwolden 68 guns (1784) - captured by the British in the Vlieter (off Texel) on 30 August 1799
 (N) Verwagting 68 guns (1784) - captured by the British in the Vlieter (off Texel) on 30 August 1799, but not added to the British Navy
 (A) Cerberus 68 guns (1784) - captured by the British in the Vlieter (off Texel) on 30 August 1799
 (A) Haarlem 68 guns (1785) - captured by the British at the Battle of Camperdown (Camperduin), 11 October 1797
 (N) Pluto 68 guns (1786) - sold to be broken up 1797
 (A) Leiden 68 guns (1786) - captured by the British in the Vlieter (off Texel) on 30 August 1799
 (N) Pieter Florisz 68 guns (1788) - broken up 1795
 (A) Prins Frederik Willem 68 guns (1788) - renamed Gelikheid in 1795 by the Batavian Republic, captured by the British on 11 October 1797
 (A) Overijssel 64 guns (purchased from Spain 1794) - captured by the British at Queenstown on 22 October 1795

4th Charter 
The ships of the 4th Charter each carried from 50 to 56 guns. In general, they chiefly between 154 and 156 (Amsterdam) feet on the upper deck (equivalent to between 143ft and 144ft 10in in British units of measurement. However, the larger Brakel and Tromp measured about 160 (Amsterdam) feet on the upper deck (equivalent to 148ft 7in in British units of measurement), with a breadth of about 45 Amsterdam feet (41¾ British feet) and a depth in hold of 20 Amsterdam feet (18½ British feet).
 (F) Prinses Frederika Louisa Wilhelmina 54 guns (1779) - wrecked 1781
 (M) Maarten Harpentzoon Tromp 56 guns (1779) - captured by the British in Saldanha Bay on 17 August 1796
 (A) Batavier 50 guns (1779) - captured by the British in the Vlieter (off Texel) on 30 August 1799
 (Z) Goes 54 guns (1781) - broken up 1797
 (M) Brakel 56 guns (1782) - captured by the British at Plymouth on 4 March 1796
 (N) Alkmaar 50 guns (1782) - captured by the British at the Battle of Camperdown (Camperduin), 11 October 1797
 (M) Delft 54 guns (1782) - captured by the British at the Battle of Camperdown (Camperduin), 11 October 1797, but foundered on route to England.
 (N) Beschermer 50 guns (1784) - captured by the British in the Vlieter (off Texel) on 30 August 1799

References
 The Dutch Navy of the Seventeenth and Eighteenth Centuries (1990) - Jaap R. Bruijn. University of South Carolina Press. .
 Dutch Warships in the Age of Sail 1600-1714 (2014) - James Bender. Seaforth Publishing, Barnsley. .
 Geschiedenis van het Nederlandsche Zeewezen (1858) - Johannes Cornelis de Jonge. 6 vols, between 1833 and 1848, Haarlem)
 Naval Wars in the Baltic 1553-1850 (1910) - Roger Charles Anderson
 Navies and Nations: Warships, Navies and Statemaking in Europe and America, 1500-1860 (1993) - Jan Glete. Almqvist & Wiksell International, Stockholm.
 Ships of the United Netherlands, 1648-1702 (1938) - A. Vreugdenhil.

 
Netherlands
Netherlands
Dutch Republic